Alger is both a given name and a surname. It originates from the Anglo-Saxon name Ælfgar, meaning “elf spear.” Notable people with the name include:

 Abby Langdon Alger (1850–1905), American writer, translator
 Alger of Liège (1055–1131), French Roman Catholic priest
 Alger "Texas" Alexander (1900–1954), American blues singer
 Alger Hiss (1904–1996), American diplomat and alleged Soviet spy
 Alger H. Wood (1891–1970), American football and basketball coach
 Alpheus B. Alger (1854–1895), Massachusetts State Senator
 Bruce Alger (1918–2015), American Congressman from Texas
 Cyrus Alger (1781–1865), American metallurgist and arms manufacturer
 Fanny Alger (1816–1889), the first plural wife of Joseph Smith, Jr.
 Francis Alger (1807–1863), American mineralogist
 Frederick M. Alger Jr. (1907–1967), American politician and diplomat
 Harry Alger (1924–2010), Canadian politician
 Horatio Alger (1832–1899), American author
 Ian Alger (1926–2009), innovative psychotherapist
 James Todd Alger (born 1933), American nature writer
 John Goldworth Alger (1836–1907), English journalist and author
 Jonathan R. Alger, President of James Madison University
 Mary Donlon Alger (1893–1977), American lawyer, politician and first woman appointed to a federal judgeship in New York
 Pat Alger (born 1947), American country music songwriter, singer and guitarist
 Percival Alger (born 1964), Filipino Olympic fencer
 Philip Rounseville Alger (1859–1912), American naval officer
 Paul Alger (born 1943), German football player
 Peter Alger (born 1952), New Zealander potter
 Ross Alger (1920–1992), Canadian politician
 Royce Alger (born 1965), American wrestler and mixed martial artist
 Russell A. Alger (1836–1907), U.S. Senator from and Governor of Michigan and U.S. Secretary of War
 Stephen Alger (born 1958), British tennis player
 William R. Alger (1822-1905), American Unitarian minister, aphorist, and author

References